is a Kofun period burial mound, located in the Miyakodori, neighborhood of Nada-ku, Kobe,  Hyōgo Prefecture, in the Kansai region of Japan. The tumulus was designated a National Historic Site of Japan in 2005.

Overview
It is located on an alluvial fan at an elevation of six to eight meters  between the southern foot of Mount Rokkō and Osaka Bay in the southeastern part of the prefecture. The existence of ancient burial mounds has been known since ancient times, and is one of the several early Kofun period burial mounds distributed in the area. Unable to choose between the two, she commits suicide and the two suitors both follow her into death.

Due to landslides and other natural disasters, notably the 1596 Keichō–Fushimi earthquake, the burial chamber of the tumulus collapsed, and the form of the tumulus became unclear. Traditionally, it was thought to be a  keyhole-shaped tumulus, but as a result of archaeological excavations that have been continuously conducted since 1985, it was found that it was the largest two conjoined rectangle style tumulus in the early Kofun period. The tumulus was found to measure 98 meters in length, with a 52-meter rear portion, 46 meter anterior, 50 meters in width at the rear, 25 meters in width at the neck, and up to 9 meters in height. The main axis is orientated in the east–west direction, and there are two or more steps in the front part, and fukiishi were slightly detected near the base. The burial chamber was a pit-type stone chamber with an auxiliary chamber, containing a split bamboo-shaped coffin. Stone materials for the burial chamber were not only local, but were also transported from Awa Province (Tokushima Prefecture) and Kii Province (Wakayama Prefecture).

Grave goods included a total of 11 Shinju-kyo bronze mirrors, including seven triangular-rimmed divine beast mirrors, of the type that the Chinese chronicle  ( "Records of Wei"), which is part of the Records of the Three Kingdoms, states that Emperor Cao Rui sent  to Queen Himiko of Wa  in the year 239 AD. Two of the triangular-rimmed mirrors were found to be wrapped in cloth. The main room contained these bronze mirrors and jasper stone spindle-shaped artifacts, while the auxiliary room contained iron products such as 56 iron arrowheads, and 26 iron swords, iron daggers, axes, and fishing gear. From these grave goods, it is estimated that the tumulus was constructed before 250 AD. In 2005, these artifacts collectively designated as a National Important Cultural Property

Currently, the tumulus is maintained as a park. It is located a two-minute walk from Nishinada Station on the Hanshin Electric Railway Hanshin Main Line.

See also
List of Historic Sites of Japan (Hyōgo)

References

Sources

External links

Kobe City home page

History of Hyōgo Prefecture
Kobe
Historic Sites of Japan
Archaeological sites in Japan
Kofun